Edward Joseph Weisenburger, J.C.L., is an American prelate of the Roman Catholic Church, serving as the bishop of the Diocese of Tucson in Arizona since 2017.  He previously served as the bishop of the Diocese of Salina in Kansas from 2012 to 2017.

Biography

Early life and education
Weisenburger was born in Alton, Illinois on December 23, 1960, to Edward John Weisenburger and Asella (Walters) Weisenburger.  In Lawton, he attended St. Barbara's Parish School and then graduated from Eisenhower High School in 1979.  

Deciding to enter the priesthood, Weisenburger began his studies at Conception Seminary College in Conception, Missouri, graduating with honors in 1983.  He then traveled to Leuven, Belgium, to attend the American College Seminary at the Catholic University of Leuven. He was awarded a Pontifical Bachelor of Theology degree along with a Master of Religious Studies degree in 1986.  Weisenburger received a Master of Moral and Religious Sciences degree there in 1987.

Priesthood
Weisenburger was ordained to the priesthood for the Archdiocese of Oklahoma City in the Cathedral of Our Lady of Perpetual Help in Oklahoma City by Archbishop Charles Salatka on December 19, 1987.  After his ordination, Weisenburger was assigned to pastoral duties at St. Mary Parish in Ponca City, Oklahoma.  In 1990, Weisenburger was sent to Ottawa, Ontario to attend St. Paul University, where he was awarded a Licentiate of Canon Law degree in 1992.  

After returning to Oklahoma, Weisenburger was appointed as vice chancellor and adjutant judicial vicar for the archdiocese.  He also performed pastoral work in the parishes and prison ministries.  In 1995, Weisenburger was appointed pastor of Holy Trinity Parish in Okarche, Oklahoma.  After the April 19, 1995, Oklahoma City bombing, Weisenburger  volunteered as an on-site chaplain for rescue workers.  In 2002, after seven years at Holy Trinity, Weisenburger was appointed pastor and then rector of the Cathedral of Our Lady of Perpetual Help Parish.  He would hold his position until becoming bishop in 2012.

While assigned to parish work, Weisenburger was also appointed in 1996 as vicar general of the archdiocese.  He served as an officer with the Archdiocesan Tribunal for almost 20 years.  He was also promoter of justice for the canonization of Stanley Francis Rother, an Oklahoma priest murdered in Guatemala.  On October 2, 2009, Weisenburger was appointed a prelate of honor to Pope Benedict XVI, with the title monsignor.

Bishop of Salina

Weisenburger was appointed bishop of the Diocese of Salina by Benedict XVI on February 6, 2012.  He was consecrated by Archbishop Joseph Naumann on May 1, 2012 in the Sacred Heart Cathedral in Salina.

Bishop of Tucson
On October 3, 2017, Weisenburger was named the seventh bishop of the Diocese of Tucson by Pope Francis.  He was installed on November 29, 2017.

At a meeting of the US Conference of Catholic Bishops on June 15, 2018, Weisenburger suggested that Catholic federal agents who separate children from undocumented immigrant parents as part of Trump Administration policy should be denied communion.

On September 19, 2018, Weisenburger made a statement in which he said the Diocese of Tucson had fired ten employees over the past 10 years due to charges of sexual misconduct.  He did not provide any details on the firings. In comments on the recent Pennsylvania grand jury report of sexual abuse by priests in that state, Weisenburger offered an opinion linking the so-called sexual revolution of the 1960's to these crimes:  “It would be way too simplistic to blame a cultural movement for what individuals have done, but I also think it would be irresponsible to not acknowledge its role.”

In December 2020, the Diocese of Tucson, along with the Archdiocese of Los Angeles, were named in a federal racketeering lawsuit by two individuals alleging sexual abuse as minors by four priests in Arizona.  One of the plaintiffs was Diana Almader-Douglas, who claimed that she was abused when she was five years old by Father Charles Knapp at her home in Pirtleville, Arizona in the 1970's.  Weisenburger said the diocese immediately notified police of the allegation, which they declined to investigation.  An outside investigation was unable to determine if the allegations were credible.  A third individual joined the lawsuit in 2021.

See also

 Catholic Church hierarchy
 Catholic Church in the United States
 Historical list of the Catholic bishops of the United States
 List of Catholic bishops of the United States
 Lists of patriarchs, archbishops, and bishops

References

External links
Roman Catholic Diocese of Tucson Official Site

Episcopal succession

 

1960 births
Living people
Salina
People from Alton, Illinois
21st-century Roman Catholic bishops in the United States
Roman Catholic Archdiocese of Oklahoma City
Religious leaders from Oklahoma
People from Hays, Kansas
Catholics from Illinois
Catholics from Kansas
Catholics from Oklahoma